Mohamed Gouni (born 27 March 1947) is an Algerian weightlifter. He competed in the men's featherweight event at the 1980 Summer Olympics.

References

External links
 

1947 births
Living people
Algerian male weightlifters
Olympic weightlifters of Algeria
Weightlifters at the 1980 Summer Olympics
Place of birth missing (living people)
21st-century Algerian people
20th-century Algerian people